Anubis is a 2002 fantasy novel written by Libyan author Ibrahim Kuni which tends to revolve around mythologies, incest, patricide, animal metamorphosis, and human sacrifice, in addition to the Tuareg folklore about Anubis.

Main idea and plot 
A child from Tuareg living between "myths"  realises he does not know some secrets.

It was not until he yelled the word "Ayla", a religious word belonging to the Tuaregs, that everyone around him was shocked that he uttered the "prophecy", and that his nanny started teaching him other types of words, like "wa", meaning the newborn, "ma", meaning mother nature,  "ba", the father or soul, and "ragh", meaning "god" or "sun".

However, he also realises that he can get into severe depressions that can make him run away from all these words, to gather some calmness out at the desert. He would hear "myths" about how fathers are never meant to be with their families because they are similar to "gods in the sky" where they only appear as ghosts or should not even appear at all.

Declaring that he is not convinced, he goes off to the west on a life-threatening quest onto the desert to find this father whom he only recognises as a shadow from his childhood. However, the spirits' world gets angry and tests his resolve. For a period, he is rewarded with the Eden of a lost oasis, but later, as new settlers come in, the destiny mimics the rise of human civilization. Over the sands and the years, the hero is chased by a lover who grows to become a sibyl-like priestess.

The novel ends with Tuareg sayings collected by the author in his search for the historical Anubis from matriarchs and sages during trips to Tuareg encampments, and from inscriptions in the ancient Tifinagh script in caves and on tattered manuscripts.

Quotes 
"The message of every life is happiness. And the life of every message is sacrificing happiness".

"The wisdom is the poetry of the wise. Poetry is the wisdom of the wise".

"The Body: the external which must be hidden.

The Soul: The internal which should be shown"

Reviews 
Researcher, Manal Abu Shuereb, argues that the title of the novel is "one of the most significant forms of modern titling revolving around mythology and symbolism".

She adds that this modern titling carries within its meaning a role of informing and determinism, and determinism can be observed through the novel genre, the author's name, and a brief about the novel.

Moreover, Amira El Zein points out to how "Kuni invented new fictive patterns within his fiction, considering how he showed myths that were "centrally intense and enduring, in addition to urging the reader to know the meaning of these tales in the manner which they have been articulated throughout time".

El Zain adds that Kuni "reformulated Anubis through his own vision and language".

References 

2002 novels
Lebanese novels
Arabic-language novels
2002 fantasy novels